Arya Mitra Sharma is Professor of Medicine and currently holds the Alberta Health Services Chair in Obesity Research and Management at the University of Alberta and medical director of the Alberta Health Services Obesity Program. In 2006 he founded and is currently Scientific Director of the Canadian Obesity Network and past-president of the Canadian Association of Bariatric Physicians and Surgeons. He also serves on numerous committees of professional organizations including The Obesity Society (TOS) and the International Association for the Study of Obesity (IASO).

Life and career
Born in Berlin (West) Germany in 1959, he moved to India in 1965 where he lived till 1977 after graduating from the Frank Anthony Public School, New Delhi. On his return to Germany in 1977, he received his Abitur from the Weidig Gymnasium, Butzbach, Hesse before taking up his medical training at the Free University of Berlin from which he graduated in 1986. In 2002 he was awarded a Canada Research Chair (Tier 1) in Cardiovascular Obesity Research and Management and was appointed Professor of Medicine at McMaster University, Hamilton, Canada.  In 2007 he was awarded the Alberta Health Services endowed chair in Obesity Research and Management and appointed Professor of Medicine at the University of Alberta, Edmonton, Canada, where he is also currently the medical director of the Edmonton Region Bariatric Program. 
In 2005 he founded the Canadian Obesity Network. He is also a founding member and current president of the Canadian Association of Bariatric Physicians and Surgeons. He writes a daily obesity blog (Dr. Sharma's Obesity Notes) and has given media interviews on global, national and local TV, radio and print media.

References

External links

Living people
1959 births
Canada Research Chairs